The 2022–23 Ardal NE season (also known as the 2022–23 Lock Stock Ardal NE season for sponsorship reasons) is the second season of the new third-tier northern region football in Welsh football pyramid, part of the Ardal Leagues.

Teams
The league was made up of 16 teams competing for one automatic promotion place to Cymru North, whilst the second-placed team qualified for a play-off with the second-placed team of Ardal NW. The bottom three teams are relegated to Tier 4.

Machynlleth have notified the Football Association of Wales of their withdrawal from the Ardal Leagues.  Notifying the league, Machynlleth said: “This decision has come about due to lack of players and commitment".

The FAW’s National Game Board (NGB) met on Tuesday, July 5 to discuss who will replace Machynlleth after their late exit. It was opted to promote the Denbighshire based team of Llangollen Town out of the options available. 

On 19 July 2022, the league suffered another blow after Berriew became the latest club to withdraw from the North East division. Explaining their decision, they released a statement that read: “The Club has lost a significant number of senior players during the close season and have not been able to replace them."

With just under three weeks until the league season starts, a reprieve or promotion for any other team remains unlikely given the fixture list has been handed out, so remaining with 15-teams is the most logisitical option.

Team changes

To Ardal NE
Promoted from Mid Wales Football League East Division
 Builth Wells
Promoted from North East Wales Premier Division
 Llangollen Town
Relegated from Cymru North
 Llanrhaeadr

Transferred from Ardal NW
 Llanuwchllyn

Transferred from Ardal SE
 Llandrindod Wells
 Rhayader Town

From Ardal NE
Promoted to Cymru North
 Chirk AAA

Relegated
 Carno
 Kerry
 Four Crosses

Withdrew from the league
 Penparcau
 Machynlleth
 Berriew

Stadia and locations

Source: Ardal NE Ground Information

Personnel

League table

Results

References

External links
Football Association of Wales
Ardal Northern Leagues
Ardal Northern Twitter Page
Tier 3 Rules & Regulations

3
Ardal Leagues
Wales